Brett MacDonald (born January 5, 1966) is a Canadian former professional ice hockey player who played in one National Hockey League game with the Vancouver Canucks during the 1987–88 NHL season, on February 14, 1988 against the Edmonton Oilers. The rest of his career was spent in the minor leagues, including several years in the Colonial Hockey League/United Hockey League.

Career statistics

Regular season and playoffs

See also
List of players who played only one game in the NHL

External links

1966 births
Canadian expatriate ice hockey players in Germany
Canadian ice hockey defencemen
Chatham Wheels players
Flint Bulldogs players
Flint Generals players
Flint Spirits players
Fredericton Express players
Krefeld Pinguine players
Ice hockey people from Ontario
Living people
Moncton Hawks players
Muskegon Fury players
Nashville Knights players
New Haven Nighthawks players
North Bay Centennials players
Orlando Solar Bears (IHL) players
Saginaw Wheels players
San Diego Gulls (IHL) players
Vancouver Canucks draft picks
Vancouver Canucks players